"Stand Up" is a song by Japanese singer-songwriter Mai Kuraki from her second studio album, Perfect Crime (2001). It was released as the third single from the album on April 18, 2001. The lyrics to the song were penned by Kuraki and the track was produced by Akihito Tokunaga. The single peaked at number two on the Oricon Singles Chart and was certified platinum by the Recording Industry Association of Japan (RIAJ). It has sold about 476,000 copies in Japan as of October 2014. The single's jacket image was compared to that of Bruce Springsteen's Born to Run (1975).

Track listing

Charts and certifications

Charts

Certifications

References

External links
Stand Up at Mai Kuraki's Official Website

2001 singles
2001 songs
Mai Kuraki songs
Giza Studio singles
Songs written by Mai Kuraki
Songs with music by Akihito Tokunaga
Song recordings produced by Daiko Nagato